Deryk Evandro Ramos (born June 14, 1994), also commonly known simply as Deryk, is a Brazilian professional basketball player. He currently plays with Caxias do Sul of the Novo Basquete Brasil (NBB). At a height of 1.88 m (6'2") tall, he plays at the point guard and shooting guard positions.

Professional career
During his pro club career, Ramos has played in South America's top professional basketball league, the FIBA South American League, and Latin America's top professional basketball league, the FIBA Americas League. He was named the MVP of the FIBA South American League's 2015 season.

National team career
Ramos represented the senior Brazilian national basketball team at the 2015 FIBA AmeriCup, in Mexico City.

References

External links
FIBA Profile 1
FIBA Profile 2
Latinbasket.com Profile
RealGM.com Profile
DraffExpress.com Profile
NBB Player Profile 

1994 births
Living people
Associação Limeirense de Basquete players
Brazilian men's basketball players
Club Athletico Paulistano basketball players
Flamengo basketball players
Novo Basquete Brasil players
Point guards
Shooting guards
UniCEUB/BRB players